The 1967–68 New York Knicks season was the 22nd season for the team in the National Basketball Association (NBA). In the regular season, the Knicks finished in third place in the Eastern Division with a 43–39 record, qualifying for the NBA Playoffs for the second consecutive season. New York lost its opening round series to the Philadelphia 76ers, four games to two. Willis Reed scored 20.6 points per game and had 13.2 rebounds per game, leading the Knicks in both categories; Frazier had a team-high 4.1 assists per game.

Walt Frazier joined the Knicks' roster in time for the 1967–68 season, having been selected by the team in the first round of the 1967 NBA draft. Bill Bradley also made his Knicks debut in 1967. New York had an early season six-game losing streak and stood at 15–22 on December 27. The Knicks then replaced their head coach, hiring Red Holzman to fill the position. To begin 1968, they won six consecutive games and reached 33–33 by mid-February. With a 28–17 record in Holzman's 45 games as coach, the Knicks reached the playoffs. The Knicks and 76ers split the first four games of their playoff series, before Philadelphia won games five and six to end New York's season.

The season was also significant for the Knicks' move to the new Madison Square Garden. Their final game in the previous Garden was on February 10, a 115–97 win against the 76ers. They would then host their first game at the new Garden on February 14, a 114–102 win against the expansion San Diego Rockets.

Draft picks

Note: This is not an extensive list; it only covers the first and second rounds, and any other players picked by the franchise that played at least one game in the league.

Regular season

Season standings

Record vs. opponents

Game log

Playoffs

|- align="center" bgcolor="#ffcccc"
| 1
| March 22
| @ Philadelphia
| L 110–118
| Willis Reed (38)
| Willis Reed (23)
| Dick Van Arsdale (8)
| Spectrum5,093
| 0–1
|- align="center" bgcolor="#ccffcc"
| 2
| March 23
| Philadelphia
| W 128–117
| Walt Bellamy (26)
| Walt Bellamy (17)
| Walt Frazier (7)
| Madison Square Garden IV15,911
| 1–1
|- align="center" bgcolor="#ffcccc"
| 3
| March 27
| @ Philadelphia
| L 132–138 (2OT)
| Cazzie Russell (40)
| Walt Bellamy (19)
| Walt Frazier (9)
| Spectrum6,951
| 1–2
|- align="center" bgcolor="#ccffcc"
| 4
| March 30
| Philadelphia
| W 107–98
| Walt Bellamy (28)
| Walt Bellamy (13)
| Howard Komives (8)
| Madison Square Garden IV18,262
| 2–2
|- align="center" bgcolor="#ffcccc"
| 5
| March 31
| @ Philadelphia
| L 105–123
| Cazzie Russell (31)
| Walt Bellamy (10)
| Howard Komives (5)
| Spectrum6,979
| 2–3
|- align="center" bgcolor="#ffcccc"
| 6
| April 1
| Philadelphia
| L 97–113
| Bellamy, Barnett (19)
| Walt Bellamy (22)
| Howard Komives (6)
| Madison Square Garden IV18,014
| 2–4
|-

Awards and records
Willis Reed, All-NBA Second Team
Walt Frazier, NBA All-Rookie Team 1st Team
Phil Jackson, NBA All-Rookie Team 1st Team

References

Bibliography

New York Knicks seasons
New York
New York Knicks
New York Knicks
1960s in Manhattan
Madison Square Garden